Getting Closer may refer to:
 "Getting Closer" (Dollhouse), a 2010 episode of TV series Dollhouse
 "Getting Closer" (song), a 1979 song from the Wings album Back to the Egg
 Getting Closer!, a 1986 album by guitarist Phil Keagg